Jean-Claude Fourneau (28 March 1907 – 9 October 1981) was a French painter close to the surrealist movement.

His mother was a descendant of Victor de Lanneau, restorer of the Collège Sainte-Barbe in Paris, of Juliette Adam, founder of a French paper, La Nouvelle Revue, muse of Léon Gambetta and the spiritual mother of Pierre Loti; and she was the daughter of Paul Segond, pioneer in the field of surgical gynaecology.

His father, Ernest Fourneau, was the founder of French medicinal chemistry.

Biography 
Draughtsman and painter imbued with classicism and surrealism, Jean-Claude Fourneau is first noticed at his show at the Jeanne Castel Gallery by André Salmon in 1932. He continued exhibiting there until 1948.

Claude Roger-Marx sees his use of drawing as a medium and appreciates their detail: "The detail in Jean-Claude Fourneau's drawings gives us a sense of the infinite (...) Fascinating in the power and sensitivity that every stroke of his brush conveys." For the literary character of his work, the critic quotes the artist himself: "I cannot conceive of a man painting who has no culture. I do not distinguish between painting and poetry, they both strive towards the same goal."

Fourneau then specialises in portraits and builds himself a solid reputation. Oriane de La Panouse, the countess of Paris, the Harcourt, Brantes, Faucigny-Lucinge, Seillière, Broglie, Pourtalès, Maillé, Montesquiou, Wendel families figure amongst his clients.

An intimate circle of people support his work leading François Pluchart to state in the review Combat during the André Weil Gallery show in 1963: "The Parisian fashion and intellectual circle has found its painter".
During the year of 1961, he interprets the role of the bishop Cauchon in Robert Bresson's The Trial of Joan of Arc.

A show in Casablanca in 1954, made him known in Morocco where he lived for several years. He painted the portraits of Lalla Malika, the sister of King Hassan II, of Lalla Lamia, his step sister, of Karim Lamrani, his prime minister, of General Oufkir and other members of the Moroccan Royal Court.
Claude Rivière states that Fourneau is the opposite of being a fashionable painter: "A great admirer of Antonin Artaud, of Paulhan, of Aragon, the artist calls upon his understanding of his model and goes beyond just a formal expression to impose his point of view."
Jean Paulhan asks himself: "By what secret, Jean-Claude Fourneau possesses such prolific fierceness?".

Jean-Claude Fourneau appears on a photograph of surrealist artists gathered at the Café Cyrano in 1953, and André Breton mentions him as being part of the group.
André Breton was a form of tutor to Fourneau, for whom he had a lot of affection and confirmed the influence of surrealism in its literary and artistic form in his work.

As if 'untempered love', 'elected love' could not find any better unravelling as in the paradox of opposites, pleasure against pain, violence against tenderness, free adult relations against faithfulness, strength against weakness...

On his return to Paris in 1968, Jean-Claude Fourneau pursues portrait painting and his last exhibition is held in 1976.

Work 

 Portrait of Andrée Seillière, oil on canvas, 1942 (coll. Andrée Jaigu)
 Portrait of Josée de Chambrun, oil on canvas, 1947 (coll. Josée and René de Chambrun Foundation)
 Portrait of Felix Yusupov, oil on canvas, 1951 (coll. Fourneau)
 Portrait of Agnès Bourgois, oil on plywood, 1953 (coll. Fondation Agnès Troublé, dite agnès b.)
 Portrait of Général Catroux, oil on canvas, 1955 (coll. Maison d'éducation de la Légion d'honneur, Saint-Denis)
 Portrait of Céleste Albaret, oil on canvas, 1957 (coll. Fourneau)
 Portrait of Princess Lalla Malika of Morocco, oil on canvas, 1958 (coll. Royal Palace of Rabat)
 Portrait of Jeanne-Marie de Broglie, oil on canvas, 1958 (coll. J.-M. de Broglie)
 Portrait of Jean Paulhan, oil on plywood, 1964 (coll. Jacqueline Paulhan)
 Portrait of Dominique Aury, oil on Isorel, 1965 (coll. Fourneau)
 Portrait of Diane de France, oil on plywood (coll. Diane de Würtemberg)
 Portrait of Karl de Würtemberg, oil on canvas (coll. Karl de Würtemberg)
 Portrait of Anne-Aymone Giscard d’Estaing, oil on canvas, 1969 (coll. A.-A. Giscard d’Estaing)

External links 

 Jean-Claude Fourneau.
 « Notes et Carnets de Jean-Claude Fourneau », Ironie, n° 142, November 2009.

Notes and references 

20th-century French painters
20th-century French male artists
French male painters
French male film actors
1907 births
1981 deaths
French surrealist artists
20th-century French male actors